Warren Wallace Beckwith Sr. (August 10, 1874 – September 24, 1955) was an American sportsman who served as a minor league baseball player during the late 1800s. His first wife was Jessie Harlan Lincoln, a member of the Lincoln family and granddaughter of President Abraham Lincoln. The couple's children were the last undisputed Lincoln descendants, Mary Lincoln Beckwith and Robert Todd Lincoln Beckwith.

Early life
Beckwith was born in Mount Pleasant, Iowa, on August 10, 1874 to Captain Warren Beckwith and Luzenia Porter. Captain Beckwith worked as general roadmaster of the Burlington railroad. After Luzenia Porter died, he married her sister Sarah Porter. Warren was the youngest of Captain Beckwith's five children. Being a "wealthy railroad executive", his father left him an inheritance when dying. The Beckwiths were considered a "distinguished family."

Beckwith attended Episcopal school Kemper Hall in Davenport, Iowa. After Kemper Hall, he attended Iowa Wesleyan University, where he was a quarterback on the football team.

Marriage with Jessie Harlan Lincoln
Beckwith met Jessie Harlan Lincoln in Mount Pleasant, Beckwith being a friend of the Lincoln family. Knowing that her family did not approve of the match, the two eloped and married on November 10, 1897. At the time, Beckwith was playing college football, and it was considered unseemly to marry a footballer. Jessie had told her mother that she was going shopping with friends, and instead rendezvoused with Beckwith to travel to Milwaukee and get married.

The marriage was performed by Pastor Orlando P. Christian. The two required witnesses were Mrs. Christian, the pastor's wife, and the Pastor's neighbor, Mrs. Henry J. Baumgaertner. It was the first time that Christian had performed an elopement ceremony, though he was not aware that it was an elopement until after the ceremony had been performed. The marriage made The New York Times, with a headline that read "R.T. LINCOLN'S DAUGHTER WEDS; Marries an Iowa Man to Whom Her Parents Objected".

After getting married, the two relocated to Chicago and Beckwith secured a job at the Chicago Light Gas & Coke Company. Two children resulted from the marriage in the following years. On August 22, 1898, she gave birth to her first child, Mary Lincoln Beckwith, in Iowa. On July 19, 1904, Jessie had Robert Todd Lincoln Beckwith, named after her father.

Beckwith and wife Jessie separated at least two times because of marital issues. In January 1905, Jessie took their two children to visit family without Beckwith. After months of arguments over the telephone, Jessie moved from their Riverside home. She moved her belongings in the Harlan home on Mount Pleasant and then moved in with her parents on Lake Shore Drive in Chicago, taking her children with her. When Jessie took the children to Europe, Beckwith filed divorce papers on January 31, 1907. He claimed desertion, and the divorce was granted. Jessie was granted custody of their children, and Beckwith never saw his children again.

Sports

Football
After Beckwith's marriage to Jessie, The New York Times covered his very next game at Iowa Wesleyan University, that being the Iowa Wesleyan Tigers versus the Keokuk College of Physicians and Surgeons (a now defunct college). The Tigers won the game 48–0.

Baseball
Beckwith played for a number of minor league baseball teams:

In 1905, Beckwith managed the Oshkosh Indians of the Wisconsin State League from Oshkosh, Wisconsin for one season. They were a D-level team.

When Jessie was four months pregnant, Beckwith tried out for and was signed to the pro baseball team in Ottumwa, Iowa, in March 1898. Sarah, Beckwith's stepmother (and aunt), went to the team manager and convinced him to release Beckwith out of his contract so he could find more suitable employment.

During his baseball tenure, Beckwith was known as "the dude" and "the lady killer".

Later life
After divorcing Jessie, Beckwith married Blanche Cutter. After the marriage with Cutter ended, Beckwith then went on to marry Vera Ward. Ward was an Asheville silent film actress, and the two married in 1924. Together they had son Warren Wallace Beckwith, Jr., who became an oceanographer and worked at the Scripps Institution of Oceanography. Warren Wallace Beckwith, Jr. married Barbara Olson, whom he survived when she died on March 1, 2014. She was the daughter of Hazel Updike Reasoner and Robert Reasoner of Omaha, Nebraska.

Beckwith moved to La Jolla, California in 1938, where he spent his time hunting and golfing. He died there on September 24, 1955.

References

External links

1955 deaths
1874 births
People from Mount Pleasant, Iowa
Paris Midlands players
Sacramento Gilt Edges players
Dallas Steers players
Iowa Wesleyan University alumni
Iowa Wesleyan Tigers football players
Aurora (minor league baseball) players
Denison-Sherman Twins players
Waco Tigers players
Lincoln family
Baseball players from Iowa
Players of American football from Iowa